Lockwood Reservoir is located in Walthamstow in the London Borough of Waltham Forest. It is one of the ten Walthamstow Reservoirs, which are part of the Lee Valley Reservoir Chain. The reservoirs supply drinking water to London and are owned by Thames Water.

Ecology
The reservoir is a Site of Special Scientific Interest (SSSI).

History
The reservoir was completed in 1903 and constructed by the East London Waterworks Company, which was then taken over by the Metropolitan Water Board in 1904.

See also
London water supply infrastructure
List of Sites of Special Scientific Interest in London

References 

Sites of Special Scientific Interest in London
Thames Water reservoirs
Reservoirs in London
Walthamstow
RLockwood
Drinking water reservoirs in England